niNe. magazine is an online publication aimed at teenage girls, a production of Nine Media LLC, founded as a print magazine by Melinda Laging and Louise Wo in 2005. Currently an online-only enterprise, its Nine Magazine, Inc. print form reached a circulation of 20,000 and a subscriber-base throughout 43 states, the District of Columbia, and four Canadian provinces.

Name etymology
The niNe. title stands for nine characteristics described in the Christian New Testament, in Paul's letter to the Galatians (5:22-23), as being the ways that the Holy Spirit contributes to a quality life:But the fruit of the Spirit is love, joy, peace, patience, kindness, goodness, faithfulness, gentleness and self-control. Against such things there is no law." (NIV)
The capitalized N is intended to draw attention to the reader's inner world, to promote inner beauty and faith in one's self.

History
Nine Magazine, Inc. was formed in Colorado by Melinda Laging and Louise Wo. While attending the University of Colorado-Boulder, Laging and Wo sought to present a magazine spotlighting current issues and interests affecting youth. 

Following graduation, the pair organized a board of directors and established the framework of the publication. With the economic conditions of the late 2000s, Nine Magazine, Inc. began restructuring to improve upon its initial digital platform.

Originally formed as a print publication, niNe. shifted to online-only content to curtail production costs and engage in emerging social media outlets. The periodical began publishing online content in the fall of 2011.

Content philosophy
The editors of the magazine note that current media outlets aimed at young women focus on entertaining, selling, and engaging their audience "through content that is in the interest of the outlet rather than the audience". They note that by addressing the facts of important issues head-on, the magazine can dedicate its pages to promoting self-esteem, volunteerism, philanthropy, positive journalism and literacy for adolescent girls. The creators of niNe. magazine have been stated as using this direct, unabashed approach to educate its audience and reconstruct the manner in which media communicates to a youth-oriented audience. They note that the philosophy seeks to engage the audience in the discussion of a topic without having conflicting messages in its advertising. niNe. is described as seeking to avoid advertisements that demean women or young girls, instead it seeks out advertisers that reinforce the beauty, intelligence, worth and strength of women.

Subjects and topics
The magazine covers issues it perceives to be significant to the daily lives of its audience. As an early reviewer states, "Whether the subject is serious or casual, the magazine strives to dig deeper into these topics. Presenting forums for teenagers in this way empowers them to express themselves in a healthy way rather than turning to food, alcohol or self-harm, often in the form of cutting. This approach helps teens move beyond those crutches and encourages them to positively express themselves."

Sections 
As of this date, the following nine sections, following a theme of "the fruits of the Holy Spirit", constituted the content of niNe: hoMe., loOk., boDy., relatioNships., reaLity., entertaiNment., yOu., intuItion., faiTh.

Cover stories

The following is a list of the cover stories of the magazine, by issue, since its founding:

 June–July 2006 – Bethany Hamilton, a teen surfer and shark attack survivor.
 August–September–October 2006 – Bethany Dillon, a Nashville, Tennessee-based singer.
 September–October–November 2011 – Beckah Shae, a Contemporary Christian singer.
 October–November 2011 – Kari Jobe.  
 March–April 2012 – Rachel Hendrix, lead actress in October Baby.
 May–June 2012 – Eleven 22.  
 July–August 2012 – Hannah Chancellor, member of An Epic, No Less.
 November–December 2012 – Taylor Spreitler, actress in Three Day Test.
 January–February 2013 – Colton Dixon, singer/musician (and American Idol contestant).
 March–April 2013 – Cody Longo, actor in Not Today.
 May–June 2013 – Skillet, a Contemporary Christian band.   
 July–August 2013 – The City Harmonic.  
 September–October 2013 – AJ Michalka, actress in Grace Unplugged.
 November–December 2013 – Kylie Bisutti, former model and author of I Am No Angel.
 January–February 2014 – Switchfoot.  
 March–April 2014 – Shane Harper, actor in God's Not Dead.
 May–June 2014 – David Crowder.
 July–August 2014 – Bluetree.
 September–October 2014 – Blake Rayne, actor in The Identical.
 November–December 2014 – Kim Walk-Smith, member of Jesus Culture.
 January–February 2015 – Old Fashioned, movie from Skoche Films.
 March–April 2015 – Fireflight.
 May–June 2015 – Dan Bremnes.

References

Further reading
Televised Interview with Editorial Director, Melinda Laging, The CW2, Denver, CO, October 4, 2006.

Online magazines published in the United States
Charities for young adults
Magazines established in 2005
Magazines disestablished in 2011
Magazines published in Colorado
Online magazines with defunct print editions
Organizations established in 2005
Teen magazines
Charities based in Colorado
Defunct magazines published in the United States